Hurry is an American indie rock band formed in Philadelphia, Pennsylvania in 2012. The band is composed of Matt Scottoline (vocals, guitar), Joe DeCarolis (bass), Rob DeCarolis (drums), and Justin Fox (guitar).

History
Hurry began as a solo project for principal songwriter Matt Scottoline, bassist of emo revival band Everyone Everywhere. He wrote the first ten to twenty Hurry songs as a way to write his own material and play guitar rather than bass. Scottoline decided to release his home recordings on Bandcamp under the moniker "Hurry," chosen as a self-deprecating joke about his writing process; he writes quickly and rarely finishes a song if it is not completed in a single session. After releasing the demos, Scottoline recruited other musicians to perform the songs live, including Everyone Everywhere guitarist Brendan McHugh and Univox bassist Rob DeCarolis on drums.

As Everyone Everywhere became less active, Hurry coalesced into a trio, adding DeCarolis's cousin and Psychic Teens/Exmaid bassist Joe DeCarolis to round out the lineup. The band signed to Hot Green Records and announced their first album, Everything/Nothing, which was recorded at The Headroom by labelmate Joe Reinhart of Hop Along. The record was preceded by its first single, "Oh Whitney," as a limited cassette release. Its accompanying music video features the band attempting to set a world record for fireworks launched off a guitar, though the record-setting display is blocked by Rob DeCarolis standing in front of the camera. Though the explosive effects were added in post-production, the fireworks were live and caused some anxiety during filming. The band later released a video for "Oozing Positivity" to coincide with Everything/Nothing'''s cassette release; the video took director Dave Peterson six months to make and depicts the band as "delightfully retro" CGI characters.

Hurry announced their second record Guided Meditation in March 2016 and was released on April 29, 2016 by Lame-O Records. It was recorded at Noisy Little Critter with Mike Bardzik. Prior to release, Scottoline said Guided Meditation will be "more confident" and "not [hide] behind noise as much".

Their third record, Every Little Thought, was announced in January 2017 and was released on February 23.

Their fourth record, Fake Ideas, was announced in May 2021 and was released on June 25. The record is their first as a quartet with the addition of guitarist Justin Fox, who joined the band in August 2019 for live performances.

Musical style
Hurry's sound has been described as power pop, fuzz or noise pop, indie pop, alternative rock and garage rock. They are often cited as early-90s rock revivalists; their influences include Weezer, Teenage Fanclub, Guided by Voices and Dinosaur Jr., though their influences also include older artists such as The Beach Boys and Paul McCartney and peers such as Yuck and Pure X. Yo La Tengo has been cited as a major influence; Scottoline has said their music showed him how an upbeat pop song could be "drenched in noise," which he cites as an important touchstone for Hurry's music. In a separate interview, he said Hurry is "better when [they're] loud."

In popular culture
The song "When I'm With You" was featured in the episode "Bagel" of the FXX series Man Seeking Woman.

"When I'm With You" also appeared in the episode "Here's Where the Story Ends" of the Netflix series Special''.

Discography

Studio albums

EPs

Singles

Other appearances

References

External links
 Official website
 Bandcamp
 Twitter

Alternative rock groups from Pennsylvania
American power pop groups
Indie rock musical groups from Pennsylvania
Musical groups established in 2012
Musical groups from Philadelphia
Musical quartets
2012 establishments in Pennsylvania
Lame-O Records artists